Susana Coppo (born 26 November 1959) is an Argentine former swimmer. She competed in five events at the 1976 Summer Olympics.

References

External links
 

1959 births
Living people
Argentine female swimmers
Olympic swimmers of Argentina
Swimmers at the 1976 Summer Olympics
Place of birth missing (living people)